Mohammad Marmour (born 4 January 1995) is a Syrian footballer who plays for Al-Manama of the Bahraini Premier League.

Career

Despite denying rumors that he was going to join Safa in mid-2017, Al Marmour eventually penned a contract with the Lebanese side, even rejecting lucrative offers from Syrian outfit Al-Jaish. At Safa, the Syrian midfielder registered his first, second, and third goals against Salam Zgharta, Al-Akhaa Al-Ahli Aley, and Al-Ansar, in the 40th, 76th, and 15th minutes respectively.

On 28 July 2020, Al Marmour scored the only goal for Tishreen in a 1–0 win against Al-Karamah to grant them their third league title since 1997.

International goals
Scores and results list Syria's goal tally first.

References

External links 
 at Soccerway
 at National-Football-Teams

1995 births
Living people
People from Latakia
Syrian footballers
Syrian expatriate footballers
Syria international footballers
Hutteen Latakia players
Tishreen SC players
Safa SC players
Mesaimeer SC players
Syrian Premier League players
Lebanese Premier League players
Qatari Second Division players
Association football midfielders
Expatriate footballers in Lebanon
Expatriate footballers in Qatar
Syrian expatriate sportspeople in Lebanon
Syrian expatriate sportspeople in Qatar